Lecithocera paralevirota is a moth in the family Lecithoceridae first described by Kyu-Tek Park in 1999. It is found in Taiwan.

The wingspan is 18–19 mm. The forewings are broader distally. The ground color is yellowish orange, irregularly suffused with dark-brown scales. There is a small discal spot before the middle and a larger, rectangular one near the end of the cell. The hindwings are grey in Colour.

Etymology
The species name is derived from the name of the related species Lecithocera levirota.

References

Moths described in 1999
paralevirota